Düvenci is a town (belde) in the Çorum District, Çorum Province, Turkey. Its population is 1,623 (2022).

References

Çorum District
Populated places in Çorum Province
Towns in Turkey